Flowerdown Barrows is a Bronze Age Barrow site near Littleton, Winchester, Hampshire, England. It is a scheduled monument looked after by English Heritage.

Description of site
The site has three Bronze Age burial mounds in a much larger cemetery, two bowl barrows and a well-preserved disc barrow which has been described as "the finest in Hampshire". The larger mound is centrally positioned and has a central hollow.

Notes

External links

English Heritage site page.
Flowerdown Barrows site page on The Megalithic Portal.
History of Littleton - including an old aerial photo of the Flowerdown disc barrow.
Satellite view Google Maps view of site.

English Heritage sites in Hampshire
History of Hampshire
Tourist attractions in Hampshire
Archaeological sites in Hampshire
Barrows in the United Kingdom